Frances Amy Lillian Sherwin (23 March 1855 – 20 September 1935), the 'Tasmanian Nightingale', was an Australian soprano singer.

Biography
She was born at Forest Home, Huonville, Tasmania on 23 March 1855. She was taught singing by her mother.

On 1 May 1878, she appeared with an Italian opera company at Hobart, Tasmania as Norina in Don Pasquale and was an immediate success. Proceeding to Melbourne with the company, she sang Lucia in Lucia di Lammermoor on 3 June 1878 and was received with great enthusiasm. During the next few weeks. she appeared as the title role in Wallace's opera Maritana, Leonora in Il Trovatore, and in other leading parts in Fanny Simonsen's troupe.

She moved to the United States in 1879, an in 1880, she created the part of Marguerite of Hector Berlioz's work The Damnation of Faust. She studied under several masters both in the U.S. and in Europe, and appeared at the promenade concerts in London in 1883. In 1885, she sang at Covent Garden and afterward with the Carl Rosa Opera Company.

From 1887 to 1889, she toured Australia, New Zealand, Japan, the U.S. and Germany with much success. In 1896, she had a tour in South Africa and was in Australia from 1897 to 1898 and in 1902 and 1903. In her later years, she taught singing at London where she died on 20 September 1935.

She married musical agent Hugo Heinrich Ludwig Gorlitz in 1878 and was survived by two children - daughter Jeanette Sherwin (British actress) and Louis Sherwin, who was a U.S.-based critic. Sherwin had an excellent light soprano voice, and for a time, she had a successful career. She lacked business sense, and her last years were clouded by a struggle with sickness and poverty. In May 1934, about £200 was raised for her benefit at Hobart.

She died on 20 September 1935 in Bromley in poverty at age 81. Her daughter Jeanette died in Bromley the following year of tuberculosis. Her son Louis died in 1978 in Albany, New York.

In 2005 Sherwin was inducted to the Tasmanian Honour Roll of Women for service to the arts.

External links

Deirdre Morris, 'Sherwin, Frances Amy Lillian (1855 - 1935)', Australian Dictionary of Biography, Volume 6, Melbourne University Press, 1976, pp 120–121.
Amy Sherwin at the Significant Tasmanian Women site.
Amy Sherwin at the D'Oyly Carte Opera Company site.
Theatre in Melbourne 1888 and Theatre in Auckland 1888 provide details of Amy Sherwin's performances for 1888.

References

1855 births
1935 deaths
Australian operatic sopranos